Jacques Lemouton (born 3 April 1903, date of death unknown) was a French boxer. He competed in the 1924 Summer Olympics. In 1924, Lemouton was eliminated in the quarter-finals of the bantamweight class, after losing his fight to the upcoming gold medalist William H. Smith.

References

External links
profile

1903 births
Year of death missing
Bantamweight boxers
Olympic boxers of France
Boxers at the 1924 Summer Olympics
French male boxers